Jesper Löfgren (born 3 May 1997), is a Swedish professional soccer player who plays as a defender for Djurgården.

References

External links

1997 births
Living people
Swedish footballers
Association football defenders
Oskarshamns AIK players
FK Karlskrona players
Mjällby AIF players
SK Brann players
Eliteserien players
Superettan players
Swedish expatriate footballers
Expatriate footballers in Norway
People from Kalmar
Sportspeople from Kalmar County